The eight-point algorithm is an algorithm used in computer vision to estimate the essential matrix or the fundamental matrix related to a stereo camera pair from a set of corresponding image points.  It was introduced by Christopher Longuet-Higgins in 1981 for the case of the essential matrix.  In theory, this algorithm can be used also for the fundamental matrix, but in practice the normalized eight-point algorithm, described by Richard Hartley in 1997, is better suited for this case.

The algorithm's name derives from the fact that it estimates the essential matrix or the fundamental matrix from a set of eight (or more) corresponding image points.  However, variations of the algorithm can be used for fewer than eight points.

Coplanarity constraint 

One may express the epipolar geometry of two cameras and a point in space with an algebraic equation. Observe that, no matter where the point  is in space, the vectors  ,  and  belong to the same plane.

Because , we get 
.

Observe that  may be thought of as a matrix; Longuet-Higgins used the symbol  to denote it.

The vectors  are parallel to the vectors  and therefore the coplanarity constraint holds if we substitute these vectors. If we call  the coordinates of the projections of  onto the left and right image planes, then the coplanarity constraint may be written as

Basic algorithm 

The basic eight-point algorithm is here described for the case of estimating the essential matrix . It consists of three steps. Finally, the internal constraints of the resulting matrix are managed. The first step is described in Longuet-Higgins' paper, the second and third steps are standard approaches in estimation theory.

The constraint defined by the essential matrix  is

for corresponding image points represented in normalized image coordinates .  The problem which the algorithm solves is to determine  for a set of matching image points.  In practice, the image coordinates of the image points are affected by noise and the solution may also be over-determined which means that it may not be possible to find  which satisfies the above constraint exactly for all points.  This issue is addressed in the second step of the algorithm.

Step 1: Formulating a homogeneous linear equation 

With

   and      and   

the constraint can also be rewritten as

or

where

   and   

that is,  represents the essential matrix in the form of a 9-dimensional vector and this vector must be orthogonal to the vector  which can be seen as a vector representation of the  matrix .

Each pair of corresponding image points produces a vector . Given a set of 3D points  this corresponds to a set of vectors  and all of them must satisfy

for the vector . Given sufficiently many (at least eight) linearly independent vectors  it is possible to determine  in a straightforward way. Collect all vectors  as the columns of a matrix  and it must then be the case that

This means that  is the solution to a homogeneous linear equation.

Step 2: Solving the equation 

A standard approach to solving this equation implies that  is a right singular vector of  corresponding to a singular value that equals zero.  Provided that at least eight linearly independent vectors  are used to construct  it follows that this singular vector is unique (disregarding scalar multiplication) and, consequently,  and then  can be determined.

In the case that more than eight corresponding points are used to construct  it is possible that it does not have any singular value equal to zero.  This case occurs in practice when the image coordinates are affected by various types of noise.  A common approach to deal with this situation is to describe it as a total least squares problem; find  which minimizes

when .

Step 3: Enforcing the internal constraint 

Another consequence of dealing with noisy image coordinates is that the resulting matrix may not satisfy the internal constraint of the essential matrix, that is, two of its singular values are equal and nonzero and the other is zero.  Depending on the application, smaller or larger deviations from the internal constraint may or may not be a problem.  If it is critical that the estimated matrix satisfies the internal constraints, this can be accomplished by finding the matrix  of rank 2 which minimizes

where  is the resulting matrix from Step 2 and the Frobenius matrix norm is used.  The solution to the problem is given by first computing a singular value decomposition of :

In the ideal case, one of the diagonal elements of  should be zero, or at least small compared to the other two which should be equal. In any case, set

where  are the largest and second largest singular values in  respectively. Finally,  is given by

The matrix  is the resulting estimate of the essential matrix provided by the algorithm.

Normalized algorithm 

The basic eight-point algorithm can in principle be used also for estimating the fundamental matrix .

where  are the homogeneous representations of corresponding image coordinates (not necessary normalized).  This means that it is possible to form a matrix  in a similar way as for the essential matrix and solve the equation

By following the procedure outlined above, it is then possible to determine  from a set of eight matching points. In practice, however, the resulting fundamental matrix may not be useful for determining epipolar constraints.

Difficulty 

The problem is that the resulting  often is ill-conditioned.  In theory,  should have one singular value equal to zero and the rest are non-zero.  In practice, however, some of the non-zero singular values can become small relative to the larger ones.  If more than eight corresponding points are used to construct , where the coordinates are only approximately correct, there may not be a well-defined singular value which can be identified as approximately zero.  Consequently, the solution of the homogeneous linear system of equations may not be sufficiently accurate to be useful.

Cause 

Hartley addressed this estimation problem in his 1997 article.  His analysis of the problem shows that the problem is caused by the poor distribution of the homogeneous image coordinates in their space, .  A typical homogeneous representation of the 2D image coordinate  is

where both  lie in the range 0 to 1000–2000 for a modern digital camera. This means that the first two coordinates in  vary over a much larger range than the third coordinate. As a consequence,  will have one large singular value and the remaining are small.

Solution 

As a solution to this problem, Hartley proposed that the coordinate system of each of the two images should be transformed, independently, into a new coordinate system according to the following principle.

 The origin of the new coordinate system should be centered (have its origin) at the centroid (center of gravity) of the image points.  This is accomplished by a translation of the original origin to the new one.
 After the translation the coordinates are uniformly scaled so that the mean of distances from the origin to the points equals .

This principle results, normally, in a distinct coordinate transformation for each of the two images.  As a result, new homogeneous image coordinates  are given by

where  are the transformations (translation and scaling) from the old to the new normalized image coordinates.  This normalization is only dependent on the image points which are used in a single image and is, in general, distinct from normalized image coordinates produced by a normalized camera.

The epipolar constraint based on the fundamental matrix can now be rewritten as

where .  This means that it is possible to use the normalized homogeneous image coordinates  to estimate the transformed fundamental matrix  using the basic eight-point algorithm described above.

The purpose of the normalization transformations is that the matrix , constructed from the normalized image coordinates, in general, has a better condition number than  has. Once  has been determined and reshaped into  the latter can be de-normalized to give  according to

In general, this estimate of the fundamental matrix is a better one than would have been obtained by estimating from the un-normalized coordinates.

Using fewer than eight points 

Since  has five degrees of freedom it should therefore be sufficient with only five point pairs to determine . David Nister proposed an efficient solution to estimate the essential matrix from set of five paired points, known as the five-point algorithm. Hartley et. al. later proposed a modified and more stable five-point algorithm based on Nister's algorithm.

See also 
 Essential matrix
 Essential matrix#Extracting rotation and translation
 Fundamental matrix
 Trifocal tensor

References

Further reading 
 

 

 

Geometry in computer vision